The Taz Estuary is a long gulf formed by the Taz River.

It begins in the mouths of the Taz and the Pur Rivers in a roughly north–south direction at a latitude of 67° 30' N, and it bends westwards at a latitude of 69° N, widening further before joining the Gulf of Ob.

The Russian Gazprom company is investing in the expansion of gas production in the Taz Estuary area, where there are said to be huge reserves.

The area of the estuary was explored early. In the 19th century Estonian biologist and explorer Alexander von Middendorff found a frozen mammoth near the Taz Estuary. The body of the mammoth was transported to St. Petersburg in 1866.

References

Estuaries of Russia
Gulfs of the Kara Sea
Bodies of water of Yamalo-Nenets Autonomous Okrug
Taz basin